Enrico Marini (born 13 August 1969) is an Italian comics artist.

His works include Gipsy with writer Thierry Smolderen and Le Scorpion with writer Stephen Desberg.

Biography

Marini was born in (Switzerland) and studied graphic arts in the School of Fine Arts of Basel.

Publications

Les dossiers d'Olivier Varèse
Published by Alpen Publishers
1990 : T.1 La Colombe de la place Rouge, written by Marelle
1992 : T.2 Bienvenue à Kokonino World, written by Thierry Smolderen
1992 : T.3 Raid sur Kokonino World, written by Thierry Smolderen
1993 : T.4 Le Parfum du magnolia, written by Georges Pop

Gipsy
Written by Thierry Smolderen
1993 : T.1 L'Étoile du Gitan, éd. Alpen Publishers
1994 : T.2 Les Feux de Sibérie, éd. Les Humanoïdes Associés
1995 : T.3 Le Jour du Tsar, éd. Les Humanoïdes Associés
1997 : T.4 Les Yeux noirs, éd. Dargaud
1999 : T.5 L'Aile blanche, éd. Dargaud
2002 : T.6 Le Rire Aztèque, éd. Dargaud

L'Étoile du désert
Written by Stephen Desberg, published by Dargaud
1996 : L'Étoile du désert T.1
1996 : L'Étoile du désert T.2
1999 : Carnet de CroquisLes Héritiers du Serpent
1998 : Les Héritiers du Serpent, written by Exem, éd. Suzanne Hurter

Rapaces
Written by Jean Dufaux, published by Dargaud
1998 : Rapaces 12000 : Rapaces 22001 : Rapaces 32003 : Rapaces 4Le Scorpion
Written by Stephen Desberg, published by Dargaud
2000 : T.1 La Marque du diable2001 : T.2 Le Secret du Pape2002 : T.3 La Croix de Pierre2004 : T.4 Le Démon au Vatican2004 : T.5 La Vallée sacrée2005 : T.6 Le Trésor du Temple2006 : T.7 Au Nom du Père2007 : H.S. Le Procès scorpion2008 : T.8 L'Ombre de l'ange2010 : T.9 Le Masque de la vérité2012 : T.10 Au nom du fils2013 : Integral in two volumes (Tomes 1 to 5 and 6 to 10)
2014 : T.11 La Neuvième Famille2019 : T.12 "Le Mauvais Augure"

Les Aigles de Rome
Published by Dargaud
2007 : T.1 Livre I
2009 : T.2 Livre II
2011 : T.3 Livre III
2013 : T.4 Livre IV
2016 : T.5 Livre V

Batman
Published by DC Comics/Dargaud
2017 : T.1 Dark Prince Charming 
2018 : T.2 Dark Prince Charming 

References

Enrico Marini at Lambiek's Comiclopedia
Enrico Marini at Bedetheque 

External links
Enrico Marini on the Raptors'' site 

1969 births
Living people
People from Liestal
Italian comics artists